Mere Anarchy is an anthology of essays by Woody Allen. First published on July 5, 2007, by Ebury Press, the book is a collection of 18 tales, 10 of which previously ran in The New Yorker. It was Allen's first collection in 25 years.

Reception
In The New York Times, Janet Maslin wrote that Allen's "writing style [...] remains impervious to the changing world around him", that the older essays "outshine" the newer ones but that the newer ones "hold their own", and that the collection is "nostalgically enjoyable" and "timelessly bright". In the Guardian, Adam Mars-Jones called the essays "perfunctory" and "lazy riffs and lame parodies [that] do more to annoy than entertain", while faulting Allen's use of a "facetious linguistic register" and "comedy names". Publishers Weekly wrote, "While this collection doesn't quite measure up to Allen's Without Feathers (1975), there are pieces here—for instance, the report on Mickey Mouse's testimony at the Michael Eisner/Michael Ovitz trial—that will put a rictus on your kisser." Tasha Robinson of The A.V. Club wrote, "At its best, Mere Anarchy is absurd fun, but even Allen's best at this point is only meant for those familiar with, and predisposed to love, his intensely quirky style."

Contents
To Err Is Human; To Float, Divine
Tandoori Ransom
Sam, You Made the Pants Too Fragrant
This Nib for Hire
Calisthenics, Poison Ivy, Final Cut
Nanny Dearest
How Deadly Your Taste Buds, My Sweet
Glory Hallelujah, Sold!
Caution, Falling Moguls
The Rejection
Sing, You Sacher Tortes
On a Bad Day You Can See Forever
Attention Geniuses: Cash Only
Strung Out
Above The Law, Below the Box Springs
Thus Ate Zarathustra
Surprise Rocks Disney Trial
Pinchuck's Law

References

External links
Woody Allen pages

2007 short story collections
Comedy books
American short story collections
Short story collections by Woody Allen
Ebury Publishing books